List of the members of the Faroese Løgting in the period 1988–1990, they were elected at the general election on 17 November 1988. The parliament had 32 members this period.

List of elected members of the Løgting 

 1988
1988 in the Faroe Islands
1989 in the Faroe Islands
1990 in the Faroe Islands
1988–1990